= Lake Bingo =

Lake in the state of Wisconsin, United States

- Location within Wisconsin Location within the United States
- Location: Portage County, Wisconsin
- Coordinates: 44°23′10″N 89°17′22″W
- Type: lake
- Basin countries: United States
- Surface area: 7 acres (2.8 ha)
- Max. depth: 21 ft (6.4 m)
- Surface elevation: 1,004 ft (306 m)

Lake Bingo is a lake in the U.S. state of Wisconsin. Lake Bingo is a 7 acres (2.8 ha) lake located in Portage County. It has a maximum depth of 21 feet (6.4 m).

It is uncertain why the name "Bingo Lake" was applied to this lake, however the name dates back to at least 1895.
